This is a list of school districts in the U.S. state of Ohio, sorted by the name of school district. Districts will often shorten their names; for example, Sandy Valley Local School District is often referred to as Sandy Valley Schools. Districts are listed by the name the district uses to refer to itself.

School districts in Ohio are classified as either city school districts, exempted village school districts, or local school districts. City and exempted village school districts are exempted from county boards of education, local school districts remain under county school board supervision. In Ohio, community schools (charter schools) serve as their own independent school districts.  School districts may combine resources to form a fourth type of school district, the joint vocational school district, which focuses on a technical based curriculum. There are currently 611 individual school districts in Ohio. In 1914, Ohio had 2,674 school districts.

In southwestern Ohio, portions of Preble and Butler counties near College Corner are served by the Union County–College Corner Joint School District of Union County, Indiana. The State of Ohio reimburses the state of Indiana for the cost of educating Ohio students.

A 
Ada Exempted Village School District, Ada
Adams County/Ohio Valley School District, West Union
Adena Local School District, Frankfort
Akron Digital Academy, Akron
Akron Public School District, Akron
Alexander Local School District, Albany
Allen East Local School District, Lafayette
Allen Educational Service Center, Lima
Alliance City School District, Alliance
Amanda-Clearcreek Local School District, Amanda
Amherst Exempted Village School District, Amherst
Anna Local School District, Anna
Ansonia Local School District, Ansonia
Anthony Wayne Local School District, Whitehouse
Antwerp Local School District, Antwerp
Apollo Joint Vocational School District, Fort Shawnee
Arcadia Local Schools, Arcadia
Arcanum-Butler Local School District, Arcanum
Archbold Area Local School District, Archbold
Arlington Local Schools, Arlington
Ashland City School District, Ashland
Ashland County-West Holmes Joint Vocational School District Ashland
Ashtabula Area City School District, Ashtabula
Ashtabula County Joint Vocational School District, Jefferson
Athens City School District, Athens
Auglaize County Educational Academy, Lima
Auglaize Educational Service Center
Aurora City School District, Aurora
Austintown Local School District, Youngstown
Avon Lake City School District, Avon Lake
Avon Local School District, Avon
Ayersville Local School District, Defiance

B 
Barberton City School District, Barberton
Barnesville Exempted Village School District, Barnesville
Batavia Local School District, Batavia
Bath Local School District, Lima
Bay Village City School District, Bay Village
Beachwood City School District, Beachwood
Beaver Local School District, East Liverpool
Beavercreek City School District, Beavercreek
Bedford City School District, Bedford
Bellaire Local School District, Bellaire
Bellbrook-Sugarcreek Local School District, Bellbrook
Bellefontaine City School District, Bellefontaine
Bellevue City School District, Bellevue
Belpre City School District, Belpre
Benjamin Logan Local School District, Bellefontaine
Benton-Carroll-Salem Local School District, Oak Harbor
Berea City School District, Berea
Berkshire Local School District, Burton
Berlin-Milan Local School District, Milan
Berne Union Local School District, Sugar Grove
Bethel Local School District, Tipp City
Bethel-Tate Local School District, Bethel
Bettsville Local School District, Bettsville
Bexley City School District, Bexley
Big Walnut Local School District, Sunbury
Black River Local School District, Sullivan
Blanchester Local Schools, Blanchester
Bloom-Carroll Local School District, Carroll
Bloomfield-Mespo School District, North Bloomfield
Bloom-Vernon Local School District, South Webster
Bluffton Exempted Village School District, Bluftton
Boardman Local School District, Youngstown
Botkins Local School District, Botkins
Bowling Green City School District, Bowling Green
Bradford Exempted Village School District, Bradford
Brecksville-Broadview Heights City School District, Brecksville, Broadview Heights
Bridgeport Exempted Village School District, Bridgeport
Bright Local School District, Mowrystown
Bristol Local School District, West Farmington
Brooklyn City School District, Brooklyn
Brookville Local School District, Brookville
Brown Local School District, Malvern
Brunswick City School District, Brunswick
Bryan City School District, Bryan
Buckeye Central Local School District, New Washington
Buckeye Local School District, Ashtabula
Buckeye Local School District, Rayland
Buckeye Local School District, Medina
Buckeye Valley Local School District, Delaware
Bucyrus City School District, Bucyrus
Butler Technology & Career Development Schools, Ohio

C 
Caldwell Exempted Village School District, Caldwell
Cambridge City School District, Cambridge
Campbell City School District, Campbell
Canal Winchester Local School District, Canal Winchester
Canfield Local School District, Canfield
Canton City School District, Canton
Canton Local School District, Canton
Cardinal Local School District, Middlefield
Cardington Lincoln Local Digital School, Cardington
Cardington-Lincoln Local School District, Cardington
Carey Exempted Village School District, Carey
Carlisle Local School District, Carlisle
Carrollton Exempted Village School District, Carrollton
Cedar Cliff Local School District, Cedarville
Celina City School District, Celina
Center for Student Achievement, Jackson
Centerburg Local School District, Centerburg
Centerville City School District, Centerville
Central Local School District, Sherwood
Chagrin Falls Village Exempted School District, Chagrin Falls
Champion Local School District, Warren
Chardon Local School District, Chardon
Chesapeake-Union Exempted Village School District, Chesapeake
Chillicothe City School District, Chillicothe
Chippewa Local School District, Doylestown
Cincinnati Public Schools, Cincinnati
Circleville City School District, Circleville
Clark-Shawnee Local School District, Springfield
Clay Local School District, Rosemount
Claymont Local School District, Dennison
Clear Fork Valley Local School District, Bellville, Butler
Clearview Local School District, Lorain
Clermont County Educational Service Center, Batavia
Clermont Northeastern Local School District, Batavia
Cleveland Heights-University Heights City School District, Cleveland Heights, University Heights
Cleveland Metropolitan School District, Cleveland
Clinton-Massie Local School District, Clarksville
Cloverleaf Local School District, Seville
Clyde-Green Springs Exempted Village School District, Clyde
Coldwater Exempted Village School District, Coldwater
Collins Career Center (Joint Vocational Academy College, JVAC), Proctorville
Colonel Crawford Local School District, North Robinson
Columbia Local School District, Columbia Station
Columbiana County Joint Vocational School District, Lisbon
Columbiana Exempted Village School District, Columbiana
Columbus City Schools, Columbus
Columbus Grove Local School District, Columbus Grove
Conneaut Area City School District, Conneaut
Conotton Valley Union Local School District, Bowerston
Continental Local School District, Continental
Copley-Fairlawn Local School District, Fairlawn
Cory-Rawson Local Schools, Rawson
Coshocton City Schools District, Coshocton
Coventry Local School District, Akron
Covington Exempted Village School District, Covington
Crestline Exempted Village School District, Crestline
Crestview Local School District, Columbiana
Crestview Local School District, Ashland
Crestview Local School District, Ashland
Crestview Local School District, Convoy
Crestwood Local School District, Mantua
Crooksville Exempted Village Schools, Crooksville
Cuyahoga Falls City School District, Cuyhoga Falls
Cuyahoga Heights School District, Cuyahoga Heights

D 
Dalton Local School District, Dalton
Danbury Local School District, Marblehead
Danville Local School District, Danville
Dawson-Bryant Local School District, Coal Grove
Dayton Public School District, Dayton
Deer Park Community City School District, Deer Park
Defiance City School District, Defiance
Delaware City Local School District, Delaware
Delphos City School District, Delphos
Dover City School District, Dover
Dublin City School District, Dublin

E 
East Cleveland City School District, East Cleveland
East Clinton Local School District, Sabina
East Guernsey Local School District, Lore City
East Holmes Local School District, Berlin
East Knox Local School District, Howard
East Liverpool City School District, East Liverpool
East Muskingum Local School District, New Concord
East Palestine City School District, East Palestine
Eastern Local School District, Sardinia
Eastern Local School District, Reedsville
Eastern Local School District, Beaver
Eastwood Local School District, Pemberville
Eaton City School District, Eaton
Edgerton Local School District, Edgerton
Edgewood Local School District, Trenton
Edison Local School District, Richmond
Edon-Northwest Local School District, Edon
Elgin Local School District, Marion
Elida Digital Academy, Elida
Elida Local School District, Elida
Elmwood Local School District, Bloomdale
Elyria City School District, Elyria
Euclid City School District, Euclid
Evergreen Local School District, Metamora

F 
Fairbanks Local School District, Milford Center
Fairborn City School District, Fairborn
Fairfield City School District, Fairfield
Fairfield Local School District, Leesburg
Fairfield Union Local School District, West Rushville
Fairland Local School District, Proctorville
Fairlawn Local School District, Sidney
Fairless Local School District, Navarre
Fairport Harbor Exempted Village School District, Fairport Harbor
Fairview Park City School District, Fairview Park
Fayetteville-Perry Local School District, Fayetteville
Federal Hocking Local School District, Coolville
Felicity-Franklin Local School District, Felicity
Field Local School District, Mogadore
Findlay City School District, Findlay
Finneytown Local School District, Finneytown
Firelands Local School District, Oberlin
Forest Hills Local School District, Newtown/Anderson Township
Fort Frye Local School District, Beverly
Fort Jennings Local School District, Fort Jennings
Fort Loramie Local School District, Fort Loramie
Fort Recovery Local School District, Fort Recovery
Fostoria City School District, Fostoria
Franklin City School District, Franklin
Franklin Local School District, Duncan Falls
Franklin-Monroe Local School District, Pitsburg
Fredericktown Local School District, Fredericktown
Fremont City School District, Fremont
Frontier Local School District, New Matamoras

G 
Gahanna-Jefferson City School District, Gahanna
Galion City School District, Galion
Gallia County Local School District, Gallipolis
Gallipolis City School District, Gallipolis
Garaway Local School District, Sugarcreek
Garfield Heights City School District, Garfield Heights
Geneva Area City School District, Geneva
Genoa Area Local School District, Genoa
Georgetown Exempted Village School District, Georgetown
Gibsonburg Exempted Village School District, Gibsonburg
Girard City School District, Girard
Gorham Fayette Local School District, Fayette
Goshen Local School District, Goshen
Graham Local School District, Saint Paris
Grand Valley Local School District, Orwell
Grandview Heights City School District, Grandview Heights
Granville Exempted Village School District, Granville
Green Local School District, Franklin Furnace
Green Local School District, Green
Green Local School District, Smithville
Greeneview Local School District, Jamestown
Greenfield Exempted Village School District, Greenfield
Greenon Local School District, Enon
Greenville City School District, Greenville
Groveport-Madison Local School District, Groveport

H 
Hamilton City School District, Hamilton
Hamilton Local School District, Columbus
Hardin Northern Local School District, Dola
Hardin-Houston Local School District, Houston
Harrison Hills City School District, Hopedale
Heath City School District, Heath
Heir Force Community School, Lima
Hicksville Exempted Village School District, Hicksville
Highland Local School District, Medina
Highland Local School District, Sparta
Hilliard City School District, Hilliard
Hillsboro City School District, Hillsboro
Hillsdale Local School District, Jeromesville
Holgate Local School District, Holgate
Hope Haven & JVAC District, Scioto County
Hopewell-Loudon Local School District, Bascom
Howland Local School District, Warren
Hubbard Exempted Village School District, Hubbard
Huber Heights City School District, Huber Heights
Hudson City School District, Hudson
Huntington Local School District, Chillicothe
Huron City School District, Huron

I 
Independence City School District, Independence
Indian Creek Local School District, Wintersville
Indian Hill Exempted Village School District, Village of Indian Hill
Indian Lake Local School District, Lewistown
Indian Valley Local School District, Gnadenhutten
Ironton City School District, Ironton

J 
Jackson Center Local School District, Jackson Center
Jackson City School District, Jackson
Jackson Local School District, Massillon
Jackson-Milton Local School District, North Jackson
James A. Garfield Local School District, Garrettsville
Jefferson Area Local School District, Jefferson
Jefferson Local School District, West Jefferson
Jefferson Township Local School District, Dayton
Johnstown-Monroe Local School District, Johnstown
Jonathan Alder Local School District, Plain City

K 
Kalida Local School District, Kalida
Kelleys Island Local School District, Kelleys Island
Kenston Local School District, Chagrin Falls
Kent City School District, Kent
Kenton City School District, Kenton
Kettering City School District, Kettering
Keystone Local School District, Lagrange
Kings Local School District, Kings Mills
Kirtland Local School District, Kirtland

L 
Lake Local School District, Uniontown
Lake Local School District, Millbury
Lakeview Local School District, Cortland
Lakewood City School District, Lakewood
Lakewood Local Schools, Hebron
Lakota Local School District, West Chester
Lakota Local School District, Kansas
Lancaster City School District, Lancaster
Lebanon City School District, Lebanon
Leetonia Exempted Village School District, Leetonia
Leipsic Local School District, Leipsic
Lexington Local School District, Lexington
Liberty Center Local School District, Liberty Center
Liberty Local School District, Girard
Liberty Union Local School District, Baltimore
Liberty-Benton Local School District, Findlay
Licking Heights Local School District, Pataskala
Licking Valley Local School District, Hanover
Lima City School District, Lima
Lincolnview Local School District, Van Wert
Lisbon Exempted Village School District, Lisbon
Little Miami Local School District, Morrow
Lockland City School District, Lockland
Logan Elm Local School District, Circleville
Logan-Hocking Local School District, Logan
London City School District, London
Lorain City School District, Lorain
Loudonville-Perrysville Exempted Village School District, Loudonville
Louisville City School District, Louisville
Loveland City School District, Loveland
Lowellville Local School District, Lowellville
Lucas Local School District, Lucas
Lynchburg-Clay Local School District, Lynchburg

M 
Mad River Local School District, Riverside
Madeira City School District, Madeira
Madison Local School District, Madison
Madison Local School District, Mansfield
Madison Local School District, Middletown
Madison-Plains Local School District, London
Manchester Local School District, Manchester
Manchester Local School District, Akron
Mansfield City School District, Mansfield
Maple Heights City School District, Maple Heights
Mapleton Local School District, Ashland
Maplewood Local School District, Cortland
Margaretta Local School District, Castalia
Mariemont City School District, Mariemont
Marietta City School District, Marietta
Marion City School District, Marion
Marion Local School District, Maria Stein
Marlington Local School District, Alliance
Martins Ferry City School District, Martins Ferry
Marysville Exempted Village Schools District, Marysville
Mason City School District, Mason
Massillon City School District, Massillon
Maumee City School District, Maumee
Mayfield City School District, Mayfield Heights, Highland Heights, Mayfield Village, Gates Mills
Maysville Local School District, Zanesville
McComb Local School District, McComb
Mechanicsburg Exempted Village School District, Mechanicsburg
Medina City School District, Medina
Meigs Local School District, Pomeroy
Mentor Exempted Village School District, Mentor
Miami East Local School District, Casstown
Miami Trace Local School District, Washington Court House
Miamisburg City School District, Miamisburg
Middle Bass Local School District, Middle Bass
Middletown City School District, Middletown
Middletown Fitness & Preparatory Academy, Middletown
Midview Local School District, Grafton
Milford Exempted Village School District, Milford
Millcreek-West Unity Local School District, West Unity
Miller City-New Cleveland Local School District, Miller City
Milton-Union Exempted Village School District, West Milton
Minerva Local School District, Minerva
Minford Local School District, Minford
Minster Local School District, Minster
Mississinawa Valley Local School District, Union City
Mogadore Local School District, Mogadore
Mohawk Local School District, Sycamore
Monroe Local School District, Monroe
Monroeville Local School District, Monroeville
Montpelier Exempted Village School District, Montpelier
Morgan Local School District, McConnelsville
Mount Gilead Exempted Village School District, Mount Gilead
Mount Vernon City School District, Mount Vernon
Mt Healthy City Schools, Mount Healthy

N 
Napoleon City School District, Napoleon
National Trail Local School District, New Paris
Nelsonville-York City School District, Nelsonville
New Albany-Plain Local School District, New Albany
New Boston Local School District, New Boston
New Bremen Local School District, New Bremen
New Knoxville Local School District, New Knoxville
New Lebanon Local School District, New Lebanon
New Lexington City School District, New Lexington
New London Local School District, New London
New Miami Local School District, Hamilton
New Philadelphia City School District, New Philadelphia
New Richmond Exempted Village School District, New Richmond
New Riegel Local School District, New Riegel
Newark City School District, Newark
Newcomerstown Exempted Village School District, Newcomerstown
Newton Falls City School District, Newton Falls
Newton Local School District, Pleasant Hill
Niles City School District, Niles
Noble Local School District, Sarahsville
Nordonia Hills City School District, Northfield
North Baltimore Local School District, North Baltimore
North Bass Local School District, North Bass
North Canton City School District, North Canton
North Central Local School District, Creston
North Central Local School District, Pioneer
North College Hill City School District, North College Hill
North Fork Local School District, Utica
North Olmsted City School District, North Olmsted
North Ridgeville City School District, North Ridgeville
North Royalton City School District, North Royalton, Broadview Heights
North Union Local School District, Richwood
Northeastern Local School District (Springfield), Springfield
Northeastern Local School District, Defiance
Northern Local School District, Thornville
Northmont City School District, Clayton
Northmor Local School District, Galion
Northridge Local School District (Johnstown, Ohio), Johnstown 
Northridge Local School District, Dayton
Northwest Local School District, Colerain
Northwest Local School District, McDermott
Northwest Local School District, Canal Fulton
Northwestern Local School District, Springfield
Northwestern Local School District, West Salem
Northwood Local School District, Northwood
Norton City School District, Norton
Norwalk City School District, Norwalk
Norwayne Local School District, Crestion
Norwood City School District, Norwood

O 
Oak Hill Union Local School District, Oak Hill
Oak Hills Local School District, Delhi Township/Green Township
Oakwood City School District, Oakwood
Oberlin City School District, Oberlin
Old Fort Local School District, Old Fort
Olentangy Local School District, Lewis Center
Olmsted Falls City School District, Olmsted Falls, Olmsted Township
Ontario Local School District, Ontario
Orange City School District, Pepper Pike, Orange, Moreland Hills, Hunting Valley, and Woodmere
Oregon City School District, Oregon
Orrville City School District, Orrville
Osnaburg Local School District, East Canton
Otsego Local School District, Tontogany
Ottawa Hills Local School District, Ottawa Hills
Ottawa-Glandorf Local School District, Ottawa
Ottoville Local School District, Ottoville

P 
Painesville City Local School District, Painesville
Paint Valley Local School District, Bainbridge
Pandora-Gilboa Local School District, Pandora
Parkway Local School District, Rockford
Parma City School District, Parma
Patrick Henry Local School District, Hamler
Paulding Exempted Village Schools, Paulding
Perkins Local School District, Sandusky
Perry Local School District, Lima
Perry Local School District, Perry
Perry Local School District, Massillon
Perrysburg Exempted Village School District, Perrysburg
Pettisville Local School District, Pettisville
Pickerington Local School District, Pickerington
Pike-Delta-York Local School District, Delta
Piqua City School District, Piqua
Plain Local School District, Canton
Pleasant Local School District, Marion
Plymouth-Shiloh Local School District, Plymouth, Shiloh
Poland Local School District, Poland
Port Clinton City School District, Port Clinton
Portsmouth City School District, Portsmouth
Preble Shawnee Local School District, Camden
Princeton City School District, Sharonville
Put-in-Bay Local School District, Put-in-Bay
Pymatuning Valley School District, Andover

R 
Ravenna School District, Ravenna
Reading Community City School District, Reading
Revere Local School District, Bath
Reynoldsburg City School District, Reynoldsburg
Richard Allen Schools, Hamilton
Richmond Heights City School District, Richmond Heights
Ridgedale Local School District, Morral
Ridgemont Local School District, Ridgeway
Ridgewood local School District, West Lafayette
Ripley Union Lewis Huntington Local School District, Ripley
Rittman Exempted Village School District, Rittman
River Valley Local School District, Caledonia
River View Local School District, Warsaw
Riverdale Local Schools, Mount Blanchard
Riverside Local School District, DeGraff
Riverside Local School District, Painesville
Rock Hill Local School District, Pedro
Rocky River City School District, Rocky River
Rolling Hills Local School District, Byesville
Rootstown Local School District, Rootstown
Ross Local School District, Hamilton
Rossford Exempted Village School District, Rossford
Russia Local School District, Russia

S 
Saint Bernard-Elmwood Place City School District, Saint Bernard
Saint Henry Consolidated Local School District, Saint Henry
Saint Joseph Private Schools, Ironton
Saint Marys City School District, Saint Marys
Salem City School District, Salem
Sandusky City School District, Sandusky
Sandy Valley Local School District, East Sparta
Scioto Valley Local School District, Piketon
Sciotoville School District, Portsmouth
Sebring Local School District, Sebring
Seneca East Local School District, Attica
Shadyside Local School District, Shadyside
Shaker Heights City School District, Shaker Heights
Shawnee Local School District, Fort Shanwee
Sheffield-Sheffield Lake City Schools, Sheffield
Shelby City School District, Shelby
Sidney City School District, Sidney
Solon City School District, Solon
South Central Local School District, Greenwich
South Euclid-Lyndhurst City School District, South Euclid, Lyndhurst
South Point Local School District, South Point
South Range Local School District, Canfield
Southeast Local School District, Apple Creek
Southeast Local School District, Ravenna
Southeastern Local School District, Richmond Dale
Southeastern Local School District, South Charleston
Southern Hills Joint Vocational School District, Georgetown
Southern Local School District, Salineville
Southern Local School District, Racine
Southern Local School District, Corning
Southwest Licking Local School District, Pataskala
Southwest Local School District, Harrison
South-Western City School District (Franklin County, Ohio), Grove City
Spencerville Local School District, Spencerville
Springboro Community City School District, Springboro
Springfield City School District, Springfield
Springfield Local School District, Holland
Springfield Local School District, New Middletown
Springfield Local School District, Akron
Springfield-Clark County Joint Vocational School District, Springfield
St. Clairsville-Richland City School District, St. Clairsville
Steubenville City School District, Steubenville
Stow-Munroe Falls City School District, Stow
Strasburg-Franklin Local School District, Strasburg
Streetsboro City School District, Streetsboro
Strongsville City School District, Strongsville
Struthers City School District, Struthers
Stryker Local School District, Stryker
Swanton Local School District, Swanton
Switzerland of Ohio Local School District, Woodsfield
Sycamore Community School District, Blue Ash
Sylvania City School District, Sylvania
Symmes Valley Local School District, Willow Wood, Waterloo

T 
Talawanda City School District, Oxford
Tallmadge City School District, Tallmadge
Teays Valley Local School District, Ashville,
Tecumseh Local School District, New Carlisle
Three Rivers Local School District, Cleves
Tiffin City School District, Tiffin
Tipp City Exempted Village School District, Tipp City
Toledo City School District, Toledo
Toronto City School District, Toronto
Triad Local School District, North Lewisburg
Tri-County Joint Vocational School District, Nelsonville
Tri-County North Local School District, Lewisburg
Trimble Local School District, Glouster
Tri-Valley Local School District, Dresden
Tri-Village Local School District, New Madison
Triway Local School District, Wooster
Trotwood-Madison City School District, Trotwood
Troy City School District, Troy
Tuscarawas Catholic Central School District, New Philadelphia, Ohio
Tuscarawas Valley Local School District, Zoarville
Tuslaw Local School District, Massillon
Twin Valley Community Local School District, West Alexandria
Twinsburg City School District, Twinsburg

U 
Ulysses Simpson Grant Joint Vocational School District, Bethel
Union County College Corner Joint School District, College Corner, Indiana
Union Local School District, Morristown
Union-Scioto Local School District, Chillicothe
United Local School District, Hanoverton
Upper Arlington City School District, Upper Arlington
Upper Sandusky Exempted Village School District, Upper Sandusky
Upper Scioto Valley Local School District, McGuffey
Urbana City School District, Urbana

V 
Valley Local School District, Lucasville
Valley View Local School District, Germantown
Van Buren Local School District, Van Buren
Van Wert City School District, Van Wert
Vandalia-Butler City School District, Vandalia
Vanlue Local School District, Vanlue
Vermilion Local School District, Vermilion
Versailles Exempted Village School District, Versailles
Vinton County Local School District, McArthur

W 
Wadsworth City School District, Wadsworth
Walnut Township Local School District, Millersport
Wapakoneta City School District, Wapakoneta
Warren City School District, Warren
Warren Local School District, Vincent
Warrensville Heights City School District, Warrensville Heights
Washington Court House City School District, Washington Court House
Washington Local School District, Toledo
Washington-Nile Local School District, West Portsmouth
Waterloo Local School District, Waterloo
Wauseon Exempted Village School District, Wauseon
Waverly City School District, Waverly
Wayne Trace Local School District, Haviland
Waynesfield-Goshen Local School District, Waynesfield
Waynesville Local School District, Waynesville
Weathersfield Local School District, Mineral Ridge
Wellington Exempted Village School District, Wellington
Wellston City School District, Wellston
Wellsville Local School District, Wellsville
West Branch Local School District, Beloit
West Carrollton City School District, West Carrollton
West Clermont Local School District, Cincinnati
West Geauga County Local School District, Chester
West Holmes Local School District, Millersburg
West Liberty-Salem Local School District, West Liberty
West Muskingum Local School District, Zanesville
Western Brown Local School District, Mount Orab
Western Local School District, Latham
Western Reserve Local School District, Berlin Center
Western Reserve Local School District, Collins
Westerville City School District, Westerville
Westfall Local School District, Williamsport
Westlake City School District, Westlake
Wheelersburg Local School District, Wheelersburg
Whitehall City School District, Whitehall
Wickliffe City School District, Wickliffe
Willard City School District, Willard
Williamsburg Local School District, Williamsburg
Willoughby-Eastlake City School District, Eastlake
Wilmington City School District, Wilmington
Windham Exempted Village School District, Windham
Winton Woods City School District, Forest Park
Wolf Creek Local School District, Waterford
Woodmore Local School District, Woodville
Woodridge Local School District, Peninsula
Wooster City School District, Wooster
World Changer Leadership Academy, Lima
Worthington City School District, Worthington
Wynford Local School District, Bucyrus
Wyoming City School District, Wyoming

X 
Xenia Community City School District, Xenia

Y 
Yellow Springs Exempted Village School District, Yellow Springs
Youngstown City School District, Youngstown

Z 
Zane Trace Local School District, Chillicothe
Zanesville City School District, Zanesville

References 

School districts
Ohio
School districts